Chris Bouchard is a British film producer and director of The Hunt for Gollum, an independent Lord of the Rings fan film. The budget was kept to £3,000 using crowd-sourced visual effects. The film was released on streaming platforms in May 2009. In its first week it was the fourth most watched film in the US “topped only by "X-Men Origins: Wolverine," "Star Trek" and a romantic comedy starring Matthew McConaughey.” As of October 2009 it had been watched by 3.5 million people.

Following this he directed feature length crime drama Hackney’s Finest in 2014, which was produced by London film studio Framestore.

In 2018 he co-directed The Little Mermaid which was released on Netflix. The film starred Shirley MacLaine, Poppy Drayton, William Moseley and Loreto Peralta.

Awards and honours 
Best Fiction Produced for the Web for The Hunt for Gollum at the 2009 Cinéma Tous Ecrans festival.

References 

British film directors
British filmmakers
British film producers
British directors
British male screenwriters
British male writers
English-language film directors
Fantasy film directors
Living people
Year of birth missing (living people)